N Line may refer to:

N Line (RTD), a commuter rail line in Denver
 N Line, a commuter rail line serving Seattle, Washington, United States
N (New York City Subway service), a subway line in New York City
Transilien Line N, a suburban rail sector in Île de France
N Judah, a light rail line in San Francisco
N (Los Angeles Railway), a former streetcar service in Los Angeles